Tigers Tübingen is a basketball team from Tübingen, a college town in central Baden-Württemberg, Germany, playing in the ProA, the country's second tier league.

Founded as SV 03 Tübingen, is affiliated with the multi-sports club SV 03 Tübingen, which was founded in 1903. In 1952, its basketball section was founded. In 2003, the name Walter Tigers Tübingen was chosen for the basketball team after the local Tübingen company Walter AG, a tool manufacturer, became the team's sponsor. The company ended their sponsorship in 2018.

Tigers Tübingen play their home games at the Paul Horn-Arena, which has a capacity of 3,132 people.

History
In 1992/93, SV 03 Tübingen became members of the Basketball Bundesliga for the first time, but didn't manage to escape relegation; a second one-season stint followed in 2001/02. After being promoted to the Basketball Bundesliga again in 2004 the name was changed to Walter Tigers Tübingen. In 14 consecutive seasons in the top flight they never succeeded in reaching the play-offs and were finally relegated to the ProA after finishing last in the 2017/18 season. In their first ProA season 2018/2019 the name was changed to Tigers Tübingen and they missed the playoffs by one spot finishing in the 9th place. The 2019/20 season will be their second season in the ProA.

Players

Current roster

Head coaches

Season by season

External links
Official website

Basketball teams in Germany
Basketball clubs in Baden-Württemberg
Tübingen
Basketball teams established in 1952
1952 establishments in West Germany
Sport in Tübingen (region)